Oakland Mills is an unincorporated community in Henry County, Iowa, United States.

History

Oakland Mills was once home to a school, a church, a railroad station, and a hotel, along with the two mills that gave it its name. It is now the site of Oakland Mills Park, a state-owned and county-maintained park that includes a nature center and campgrounds. 

Oakland Mills' population was estimated as 100 in 1940.

In the 1970s, its population was estimated at 30 to 35 people.

References

Unincorporated communities in Henry County, Iowa
Unincorporated communities in Iowa